Godwin Beach is a coastal rural locality in the Moreton Bay Region, Queensland, Australia.

History 
The locality is named after Charles Godwin who owned a fish cannery by the beach from 1897 to 1907. Godwin was employed to salvage these barrels and transport them to Brisbane. While doing so, on 20 February 1911 he was thrown from his boat in rough seas off Toorbul Point and he drowned.

Circa 1999, a monument commemorating Godwin was erected on the beachfront.

The median age of the Godwin Beach population was 41 years, 4 years above the national median of 37.  77.3% of people living in Godwin Beach were born in Australia. The other top responses for country of birth were England 7%, New Zealand 5.4%, Cambodia 0.7%, Hong Kong 0.7%, Germany 0.7%.  92.3% of people spoke only English at home; the next most common languages were 1.1% Thai, 0.9% Tagalog, 0.9% German, 0.9% Greek, 0% Gaelic (Scotland).

Attractions 
There is a memorial to Charles Godwin along the beachfront.

References 

Suburbs of Moreton Bay Region
Localities in Queensland